Grumbach is a village and a quarter of the town of Bad Langensalza in Thuringia, central Germany.

Location 
Grumbach is a dead-end village: the only road out of Grumbach leads to the neighbouring village of Henningsleben. A well-maintained agricultural road (Schwichingsweg) leads to the Harthhaus on the Bundesstraße 84,  to the west, a former customs house on the border of the districts of Gotha and Unstrut-Hainich and now an excursion destination. Another agricultural road connects the village with Wiegleben,  to the south.

History 
Grumbach was first mentioned in a document in 1206.

The village was incorporated into Bad Langensalza on 1 April 1993.

Sights 

 The church of St Vincentius dates from 1607. The previous building, which was on the same site, was destroyed by lightning.

References

External links 

Bad Langensalza
Former municipalities in Thuringia